United Italian Provinces or Italian United Provinces (in modern Italian: Province Unite Italiane) was a short-lived state (a Republic) that was established in 1831 in some territories of the Papal States (Romagna, Marche and Umbria) and in the Duchies of Parma and Modena.

It existed from February 5 (following the popular uprising in Bologna, when the temporal power of the Pope and the Emilian Dukes were declared to be revoked) until April 26, the day the city of Ancona was taken by the Austrian troops.

Government 
The Constitution of the Italian United Provinces was adopted on March 4 by a national Assembly. The executive power was vested in:
 Giovanni Vicini, President
 Leopoldo Armaroli, Minister of Justice
 Terenzio Mamiani della Rovere, Minister of the Interior
 Lodovico Sturiani, Minister of Finance
 Cesare Bianchetti, Minister of Foreign Affairs
 General Pier Damiano Armandi, Minister of War and Navy
 Pio Sarti, Minister of Police
 Francesco Orioli, Minister of Public Education

History 
The revolutionary government of the Italian United Provinces fell on April 26, 1831. It was brought down by Austrian troops sent to the aid of the Pope and the Emilian Dukes.

References

External links 
 Flag and history of the Italian United Provinces
 Biography of Giovanni Vicini, President of the Italian United Provinces

States and territories established in the 1830s
States and territories disestablished in the 1830s
Italian states
Italian unification
History of Emilia-Romagna
History of Bologna
History of Umbria
History of le Marche